A Moment of Love is a 2013 Chinese-Taiwanese drama-romance film directed by Gavin Lin and starring Liu Shishi and Vic Chou.

Plot
Ji Yaqing goes on a business trip right before her wedding. She meets on her stay at the hotel a young man intent on the search of an old lady, having in his possession only letters his grandfather wrote before passing away. They go together on a journey in the country scenery of China, in the quest of the lady in the letters. This journey yet holds more for both of them, as they discover what love could mean and bring.

Cast
Liu Shishi as Ji Yaqing (#1), a Beijing-based magazine journalist
Zhou Yiwei as Cheng Zhiyuan, Ji Yaqing (#1)'s fiancé
Liu Yun as Vivian, Ji Yaqing (#1)'s best friend
Wang Lie as Derrick, Vivian's boyfriend
Ji Qin as Ji Yaqing (#2), an old lady in Yunnan
Ai Yuqiao as younger Ji Yaqing (#2)
Vic Chou as Xu Nianzu, a Taiwanese tourist
Chiu Chen-en as young Xu Nianzu
Chang Fu-chien as Xu Xianda, Xu Nianzu's adoptive grandfather, who moved from Yunnan to Taiwan in the 1940s
Zhang Aijun as younger Xu Xianda

References

External links

2013 films
Chinese romantic drama films
Taiwanese romantic drama films
Films set in Yunnan
Films shot in Yunnan
Films set in Beijing
Films shot in Beijing
Films directed by Gavin Lin
2010s Mandarin-language films